Chagrinia is a genus of prehistoric lobe-finned fish which lived during the Late Devonian period.

The holotype, Chagrinia enodis, was found eroded out of the Chagrin Shale in the Euclid Creek Reservation in Cleveland, Ohio, in 1960 by a local citizen.

The fossil material is poorly preserved, but the species appears to exhibit a slender body, narrow caudal peduncle, symmetrical tail, and fin rays that outnumber the endochondral supports. The scales appeared to be unornamented, but that may be a preservational artefact.

References

Bibliography

Prehistoric lobe-finned fish genera
Late Devonian animals
Late Devonian fish
Devonian bony fish
Fossils of the United States